San Rafael is a town and commune of the Talca Province in the Maule Region of Chile. The town serves as the communal capital.

Demographics
Of these, 3,482 (45.4%) lived in urban areas and 4,192 (54.6%) in rural areas. The population grew by 6.5% (465 persons) between the 1992 and 2002 censuses.

Administration
As a commune, San Rafael is a third-level administrative division of Chile administered by a municipal council, headed by an alcalde who is directly elected every four years. The 2008-2012 alcaldesa is CLAUDIA  ALEJANDRA DIAZ BRAVO. (UDI).

Within the electoral divisions of Chile, San Rafael is represented in the Chamber of Deputies by Pablo Lorenzini (PDC) and Pedro Pablo Alvarez-Salamanca (UDI) as part of the 38th electoral district, together with Curepto, Constitución, Empedrado, Pencahue, Maule, San Clemente, Pelarco and Río Claro. The commune is represented in the Senate by Juan Antonio Coloma Correa (UDI) and Andrés Zaldívar Larraín (PDC) as part of the 10th senatorial constituency (Maule-North).

References

External links
  Municipality of San Rafael

Populated places in Talca Province
Communes of Chile